Churchmanship (or churchpersonship; or tradition in most official contexts) is a way of talking about and labelling different tendencies, parties, or schools of thought within the Church of England and the sister churches of the Anglican Communion.

Overview
The term is derived from the older noun churchman, which originally meant an ecclesiastic or clergyman but, some while before 1677, it was extended to people who were strong supporters of the Church of England and, by the nineteenth century, was used to distinguish between Anglicans and Dissenters. The word "churchmanship" itself was first used in 1680 to refer to the attitude of these supporters but later acquired its modern meaning. While many Anglicans are content to label their own churchmanship, not all Anglicans would feel happy to be described as anything but "Anglican". Today, in official contexts, the term "tradition" is sometimes preferred.

"High" and "Low", the oldest labels, date from the late seventeenth century and originally described opposing political attitudes to the relation between the Church of England and the civil power. Their meaning shifted as historical settings changed and, towards the end of the nineteenth century, they had come to be used to describe different views on the ceremonies to be used in worship. Shortly after the introduction of the "High/Low" distinction a section of the "Low" Church was nicknamed Latitudinarian because of its relative indifference to doctrinal definition. In the nineteenth century this group gave birth to the Broad Church which, in turn, produced the "Modernist" movement of the first half of the twentieth century. Today, the "parties" are usually thought of as Anglo-Catholics, evangelical Anglicans, and Liberals and, with the exception of "High Church", the remaining terms are mainly used to refer to past history. The precise shades of meaning of any term vary from user to user and mixed descriptions such as liberal-catholic are found. Today "Broad Church" may be used in a sense that differs from the historical one mentioned above and identifies Anglicans who are neither markedly high, nor low/evangelical nor liberal.

It is an Anglican commonplace to say that authority in the church has three sources: Scripture, Reason and Tradition. In general, the Low churchman and the Evangelical tends to put more emphasis upon Scripture, the Broad churchman and the Liberal upon reason and the High churchman and/or Anglo-Catholic upon tradition. The emphasis on "parties" and differences is necessary but in itself gives an incomplete picture. Cyril Garbett (later Archbishop of York) wrote of his coming to the Diocese of Southwark:

and William Gibson commented that

A traditional poem to describe churchmanship is "Low and Lazy, Broad and Hazy, and High and Crazy." Lazy refers to simpler worship, hazy to unclear tradition or beliefs, and crazy to excessive ceremonialism; but the author of the poem may have been a humorist.

Sometimes the concept of churchmanship has been extended to other denominations. In Lutheran churches it can be liberal Protestant, pietist, confessional Lutheran, or evangelical Catholic.

In the United States a "churchman" is a member of the Episcopal Church in the United States of America (ECUSA). Usage of the term began in the nineteenth century and has been modified in the twentieth century.

Gallery

See also
 Central churchmanship
 Liberal Anglo-Catholicism
 Conservative evangelicalism in Britain
 Homosexuality and the Anglican Communion
 Crypto-papism
 Crypto-Calvinism

References

Bibliography
 
 
 
 
 
 
 
 
 
 
 
 
 

 
 
Christian terminology